David Ellis is a retired British swimmer who won five Paralympic gold medals. He was the highest performing British athlete at the 1968 Summer Paralympics in Tel Aviv, winning two golds and a silver.

References

Paralympic medalists in swimming
British male swimmers
Medalists at the 1968 Summer Paralympics
Medalists at the 1964 Summer Paralympics
Medalists at the 1972 Summer Paralympics
Paralympic gold medalists for Great Britain
Paralympic silver medalists for Great Britain
Swimmers at the 1964 Summer Paralympics
Swimmers at the 1968 Summer Paralympics
Swimmers at the 1972 Summer Paralympics
Paralympic swimmers of Great Britain